The Karanj oil field is an Iranian oil field located  east of the Ahvaz City, in Khuzestan Province. It was discovered in 1963 and the production was started after installing production facilities in 1964. The field has a 650-metre thick oil column with an API gravity of 33.9 deg. Its oil reserves have been estimated at 11.2 bn barrels, with gas at about 3.5 TCF. A gas injection project at Karanj was completed in 1995. The field is owned by state-owned National Iranian Oil Company (NIOC) and operated by National Iranian South Oil Company (NISOC).

See also

List of oil fields

References

Oil fields of Iran